The Old Calendar Orthodox Church of Romania is an Old Calendarist denomination.

External links
Official Website

Romanian Orthodox Church
Romania
Christian denominations established in the 20th century
Eastern Orthodox organizations established in the 20th century
Old Calendarist church bodies and jurisdictions